Gouézec is a commune in the Finistère department of Brittany in north-western France.

Population
Inhabitants of Gouézec are called in French Gouézécois.

Geography

The river Aulne forms the commune's northern border. The Kareg an Tan (270 meters above sea level) is the highest peak in the village.

Map

See also
Communes of the Finistère department

References

External links

Mayors of Finistère Association 

Communes of Finistère